This is a list of compositions by Friedrich Kalkbrenner.

Piano

Piano Solo
Three Piano Sonatas, Op. 1
Three Piano Sonatas, Op. 4
Fantasia No. 1, Op. 5
Fantasia No. 3, Op. 8
Piano Sonata in F major, Op. 13
24 Etüden durch alle Tonarten, Op. 20
Variations on a theme by Rousseau, Op. 23
Grand Sonata in F major, Op. 28
Rondino, Op. 32
Piano Sonata in A major, Op. 35
Il Lamento, Op. 36
Piano Sonata in A-flat major, Op. 40
Piano Sonata for the left hand, Op. 42
Dramatic Sonata, Op. 46
Piano Sonata in A minor, Op. 48
Fantasie No. 8, Op. 50
Introduction and Rondo, Op. 52
Three Romances, Op. 54
Polonaise Brillante, Op. 55
Piano Sonata in honour of my master J. Haydn, Op. 56
Rondo Pastoral, Op.59
Rondo on a theme by Mr. Bishop, Op. 65
Rondeau Villageoise, Op. 67
Effusio musica, Op. 68
Les Charmes de la Walse, Op. 73
Introduktion und Rondino, Op. 78
24 Preludes, Op. 88
Nocturne, Op. 95
Romance et Rondo Brillant, Op. 96
Menuett und Rondo, Op. 97
Theme and Variations, Op. 103
Capriccio, Op. 104
Etudes, Op. 108
Rondo Brillant sur un motif de L’Opéra “Se Serment” ou le faux monnayeurs, Op. 116
Variations on a mazurka by Chopin, Op. 120
Les Soupirs, Op. 121
Rondo Brillant. Op. 130
Le Fou, Op. 136
La femme du Marin, Op. 139
Introduction et Polonaise Brillante, Op.141
Souvenir de "Guido et Ginevra" de Halévy, Op. 142
25 Grandes études, Op. 143
Three Romances, Op. 148
Rondoletto Brillant, Op. 150
Piano Sonata in A flat major, Op. 177
Fantaisie pour le Piano sur le célèbre air Auld Robin Gray, Op.178
L'Écosse, Op. 184
Etudes pour le Piano, Op. 185
3 Nocturnes, Op. 187
Drei Lieder Ohne Worte, Op. 189
Fantasia No. 10 "Sur un air irlandais"

Piano, Four hands
Double Sonata in C major, Op. 3
Double Sonata, Op. 22
Double Sonata, Op. 39
Double Sonata, Op. 79

Chamber music

Piano Trio
Piano Trio No. 1 in E minor, Op. 7
Piano Trio No. 2 in A-flat major, Op. 14
Piano Trio No. 3 in B-flat major, Op. 26
Piano Trio No. 4 in D major, Op. 84
Piano Trio No. 5 in A-flat major, Op. 149

Piano Quintet
Piano Quintet in C major, Op. 30
Piano Quintet in A minor, Op. 81
Variations brillantes sur l'Air Je suis le petit tambour, Op. 112

Piano Sextet
Piano Sextet in G major, Op. 58
Piano Sextet in F minor, Op. 135

Other
Sonata for Flute or Violin and Piano, Op. 22
Septet in A major, Op. 132
Septet in E-flat major, Op. 15
Piano Quartet in D major, Op.  2
Grande Marche, Orage, Polonaise, Op.93
 Piano Quartet in E minor, Op. 176( possibly Op. 175)

Orchestral

Piano and Orchestra
Piano Concerto No. 1 in D minor, Op.61
Gage d'Amitié, Introduction & Rondo brillant for piano and orchestra, Op.66
Fantasie and grand variations for piano and orchestra, Op.70
Fantaisie et Variations sur un Thème éccosais for piano and orchestra, Op.72
Fantaisie et variations brillantes sur l'air 'Di tanti palpiti', Op.83
Piano Concerto No. 2 in E minor, Op.85
Bravura Variations on 'God Save the King', Op.99
Introduction et Rondeau Brilliant for piano and orchestra, Op.101
Adagio ed Allegro di bravura, Op.102
Piano Concerto No. 3 in A minor, Op.107
Le Rêve, Op.113
Grand Concerto for two pianos, Op.125
Piano Concerto No. 4 in A flat major, Op.127
Les Charmes de Carlsbad, Op.174

References

External links
 List of compositions (in German)

Kalkbrenner, Friedrich